Castle Rock is a volcanic plug located  west of Iskut and  northwest of Tuktsayda Mountain in British Columbia, Canada. Castle Rock is part of the Pacific Ring of Fire that includes over 160 active volcanoes and is in the Klastline Group of the Northern Cordilleran Volcanic Province and last erupted in the Pleistocene.

Castle Rock is one of ten major Canadian volcanoes with recent seismic activity, the others being the Mount Edziza volcanic complex, Mount Cayley, Hoodoo Mountain, The Volcano, Crow Lagoon, Mount Silverthrone, the Mount Meager massif, the Wells Gray-Clearwater volcanic field and Mount Garibaldi.

See also
Northern Cordilleran Volcanic Province
List of volcanoes in Canada
List of Northern Cordilleran volcanoes
Volcanism in Canada
Volcanism of Western Canada
Volcanic history of the Northern Cordilleran Volcanic Province

References

Further reading

Volcanic plugs of British Columbia
One-thousanders of British Columbia
Northern Cordilleran Volcanic Province
Stikine Country
Stikine Plateau
Pleistocene volcanoes